E4 is a British television channel, a sister station of Channel 4. The following is a list of programmes that are broadcast on E4.

Currently broadcast

Comedies 
 8 Out of 10 Cats (2017–present) (Also shown on E4 Extra)
 The Inbetweeners (2008–10)
 The Holden Girls: Mandy & Myrtle (2021-present)

Reality/non-scripted 
 Body Fixers (2016–present)
 Coach Trip (2016–present)
 Celebs Go Dating (2016–present)
 Don't Tell the Bride (2017–present)
 First Dates Teens (2021-present)
GamesMaster (2021–present)
 Made in Chelsea (2011–present)
Married at First Sight UK (2021–present) (moved from Channel 4 for series six)
 Naked Attraction (repeated from Channel 4)
 Pete & Sam's Reality News (2020-present)
 The Real Dirty Dancing (2022–present)
 Rude Tube (2008–2017, moved to E4 Extra)
 Street Dance: Against the Odds (2022–present)
 Teen Mum Academy (2022–present)

'First Look' Channel 4 programming 
 Hollyoaks (soap opera) (2005–present)

Acquired programming from North America (first run) 
Batwoman (29 March 2020–present)
Below Deck Mediterranean (reality) (2021–present) (second run only) (first run rights are with Hayu)
Birdgirl (2021–present)
Black-ish (sitcom) (2016–present)
Charmed (fantasy drama) (2019–present)
Fear the Walking Dead (post-apocalyptic drama) (2018–present) (also on AMC)
The Goldbergs (sitcom) (2015–present)
The Good Place (sitcom) (2018–present) (also available on Netflix)
Harley Quinn (7 May 2020–present)
Killing It (2022–present)
Legendary (2021–present)
Lego Masters USA (2021–present)
The Neighborhood (2022–present)
12 Dates of Christmas (from 13 December 2021)
Rick and Morty (15 February 2019–present) (moved from TruTV and Comedy Central, also available on Netflix)
Tuca & Bertie (2022–present)
Summer House (2022–present) (second run only, also available on Hayu)
Smiling Friends (2022–present)
Teenage Euthanasia (2022-present)
Robot Chicken (15 February 2019–present) (previously part of TruTV's Adult Swim Friday night line-up)
Young Sheldon (sitcom) (2018–present)
Wipeout USA (sports) (2021–present)
Zoey's Extraordinary Playlist (musical) (2021–present)

Acquired programming from Australia (first run) 
First Dates Australia (reality) (2016–present)
Gogglebox Australia (reality) (2018–present)
Lego Masters Australia (2021–present)
Married at First Sight Australia (2016–present)

Acquired programming (repeats) 
 Mike & Molly (sitcom)
 Ramsay's Kitchen Nightmares USA (reality)

Previously broadcast

E4 comedies 
 School of Comedy (2009–10)
 PhoneShop (2010–13)
 Beaver Falls (2011–12)
 Cardinal Burns (2012 Channel 4 2014)
 The Midnight Beast (2012–14)
 Noel Fielding's Luxury Comedy (2012–14)
 Drifters (2013–2016)
 Chewing Gum (2015–2017)
 Wasted (2016)
 Crazyhead (2016)
 Gap Year (2017)
 Dead Pixels (2019–2021)
 Maxxx (2020)

Acquired comedies  
 2 Broke Girls (sitcom)
 Angie Tribeca (sitcom)
 Baby Daddy (sitcom) (now on Disney+)
 Being Erica (comedy-drama)
 Happy Endings (sitcom)
 How I Met Your Mother (sitcom)
 Marry Me (sitcom)
 Rules of Engagement (sitcom)
 Speechless (sitcom)
 Suburgatory (sitcom)
 Young & Hungry (sitcom)

E4 dramas 
 Skins (2007–13)
 Misfits (2009–13)
 My Mad Fat Diary (2013–15)
 Youngers (2013–14)
 Glue (2014)
 Tripped (2015)
 The Aliens (2016)

Acquired dramas 
 90210 (teen drama) (now on All 4 and Paramount+)
 Being Erica (comedy-drama)
 Charlie's Angels (drama)
 Charmed (fantasy-drama) (now on E4 Extra, All 4 and Paramount+)
 Life Unexpected (drama)
 Make It or Break It (teen drama)
 Revenge (drama) (now on Disney+)
 Supernatural (fantasy-drama) (moved from Sky Living) (now on Amazon Prime Video and ITVX (seasons 1–13 only)
 The Tomorrow People (sci-fi drama)
 Veronica Mars (teen drama-mystery) (now on Lionsgate+ and ITV2 (seasons 1-3 only))

Reality/non-scripted 
 Rude Tube (2008–2018, moved to 4Music)
 Dirty Sexy Things (2011)
 Playing It Straight (2011–2012)
 Tool Academy (2011–2012)
 Desperate Scousewives (2011–2012)
 What Happens in Kavos... (2013)
 Party House (2014)
 Troy (2014–2015)
 Virtually Famous (2014–2017)
 Tattoo Fixers (2015–2019)
 Young, Free and Single: Live (2015)
 Look Into my Eyes (2015–present)
 How to.. (2015–present)
 Rich Kids of Instagram (2016)
 Stage School (2016–2017)
 Polterguest (2016–present)
 Game of Clones (2017)
The Crystal Maze (15 November 2020–31 December 2020) (the show moved from its slot on Channel 4 to run-out unaired episodes on E4)

Spin-off from Channel 4 programming 
 The Jump: On the Piste (2015)

Other previous programming 
 The 100 (drama)
 100 Greatest (documentary)
 Accidentally on Purpose (sitcom)
Agents of S.H.I.E.L.D. (superhero drama) (moved from Channel 4, now moved to Disney+)
 Allen Gregory (animated comedy) 
 Almost Royal (comedy-reality) 
 As If (comedy-drama)
 Balls of Steel Australia (comedy)
 Banana (drama)
 Banzai (comedy/game show) (now on All 4)
 Bob's Burgers (animated comedy) (moved to Comedy Central after two seasons, now moved to Disney+ for future seasons)
 The Class (sitcom)
 The Cleveland Show (animated comedy) (repeats now on Disney+)
 Clone High (animated comedy)
 Containment (sci-fi drama)
 Gotham (superhero drama) (seasons 4–5 only)
 Desperate Housewives (comedy-drama)
 Dirty Sexy Money (drama)
 Duncanville (animated comedy) (20 October 2021—24 November 2021) (moved from Channel 4 for series two, and later moved to 4Music for series three in 2022)
 The Drew Carey Show (sitcom)
 Empire (drama) (moved to 5Star after three seasons)
 ER (medical drama) (moved to More4 after seven seasons)
 The Event (drama)
 Everwood (drama)
 Father Ted (sitcom) (repeats now on More4)
 Fonejacker (comedy)
 Franklin & Bash (comedy-drama) (moved to Sony Channel after two seasons)
 Friends (sitcom) (repeats now on Comedy Central)
 Gilmore Girls (comedy-drama) (repeats now on 5Star and Paramount Network)
 Glee (comedy-drama) (moved to Sky One after two seasons)
 Greek (comedy-drama)
 Happy Together (sitcom) 
 Hollyoaks Best Bits 2011 (drama)
 Hollyoaks: Chasing Rainbows (drama)
 Hollyoaks Favourites (drama)
 Hollyoaks: In the City (drama)
 Hollyoaks Later (drama)
 Hollyoaks: Let Loose (drama)
 Hollyoaks: A Little Film About Love (drama)
 Hollyoaks: The Good, the Bad and the Gorgeous (drama)
 The Inbetweeners USA (sitcom)
 Jane the Virgin (drama) (after two seasons moved to Netflix)
 Kevin Can Wait (sitcom)
 King of the Hill (animated comedy) (repeats moved to 4Music but later disappeared from the schedule on 4Music sometime in 2020 and never aired on UK television again)
 Krypton (sci-fi drama)
 Last Man Standing (sitcom) (moved to 5Star, now moved to Disney+ for the final season)
 Let's Get Physical (sitcom) 
 Lost (drama) (moved to Sky One after two seasons)
 Man with a Plan (sitcom)
 The Mindy Project (sitcom)
 My Name Is Earl (sitcom) (now on Disney+)
 Napoleon Dynamite (animated comedy) 
 Nashville (drama) (moved to Sky Living after one season)
 The New Normal (sitcom)
 New Girl (sitcom)
 Night Court (sitcom)
 No Angels (drama)
 The O.C. (drama) (now on ITV2)
 One Tree Hill (drama) (now on ITV2)
 Oz (prison-drama)
 Perfect Couples (sitcom)
 Princess Nikki (reality)
 Queer as Folk (drama)
 Reaper (comedy-drama)
 The Ricky Gervais Show (animated comedy)
 Rock School (documentary/reality, also known as The Samanie & Ellie Programme)
 Rush Hour (comedy-drama)
 Samantha Who? (sitcom)
 School of Rock (music comedy) (now on Nickelodeon and Paramount+)
 Scream Queens (horror comedy-drama) (now on Disney+)
 Scrubs (medical sitcom) (now on Disney+ and E4 Extra)
 The Secret Life of Us (drama)
 Sex and the City (comedy-drama) (now on Sky Comedy)
 Shipwrecked (reality)
 Shameless (comedy-drama)
 Six Feet Under (comedy-drama)
 Smallville (superhero drama)
 The Sopranos (drama) (repeats now on Sky Atlantic)
 Taking New York (reality)
 Teachers (comedy-drama)
 Timeless (sci-fi drama) 
 Two and a Half Men (sitcom)
 The War at Home (sitcom)
 The West Wing (political-drama) (moved to More4 after four seasons)
 Totally Frank (music/drama about a failed girl band
 Ugly Betty (comedy-drama)
 What About Brian (comedy-drama)
 Wife Swap UK (reality)
 Wildfire (drama)
 X-Rated: The TV They Tried to Ban (documentary)

References 

E4